Gordana Bogojević, married Kovačević, (22 May 1974 – 5 December 2009) is a former Yugoslavian and Serbian female basketball player and former member of basketball national team of FR Yugoslavia.

External links
In memoriam
Gordana Bogojević
Profile at eurobasket.com

1974 births
2009 deaths
Serbs of Croatia
Basketball players from Zagreb
Serbian expatriate basketball people in the Czech Republic
Serbian expatriate basketball people in Hungary
Serbian expatriate basketball people in Italy
Serbian expatriate basketball people in Poland
Serbian expatriate basketball people in Slovakia
Serbian expatriate basketball people in Spain
Serbian women's basketball players
Yugoslav women's basketball players
Power forwards (basketball)
ŽKK Crvena zvezda players
ŽKK Vršac players